Arthur Fisher Whittem (July 21, 1879 – 1958) was the Chairman of Commission on Extension Courses and Director of the University Extension at Harvard University from 1922 to 1946.  He was the second person to hold the position.  He graduated from Harvard College in 1902 and served as a professor of Romance languages and as director of the Harvard Summer School before becoming dean.

References

Works cited

1879 births
1958 deaths
Harvard Extension School faculty
Harvard University administrators
Harvard College alumni
People from Massachusetts
Burials in New Hampshire